Teniorhinus harona, the arrowhead orange or arrowhead skipper, is a butterfly in the family Hesperiidae. It is found in Angola, the Democratic Republic of the Congo (Shaba), Tanzania, Zambia, Malawi, Mozambique, Zimbabwe and Botswana. The habitat consists of deciduous woodland and Brachystegia woodland.

Adults of both sexes are attracted to flowers and males mud-puddle. Adults are on wing from August to October and from December to May in two generations per year.

The larvae feed on Brachystegia boehmii.

References

Butterflies described in 1881
Erionotini
Taxa named by John O. Westwood
Butterflies of Africa